Pepelillo's Mas is an archaeological deposit of the deposit of Pepelillo-2 (Agullent), located to the band southern center of the Valley d'Albaida, between the calcareous slopes of Agullent's Saw and the fluvial terraces of the river d'Ontinyent, the Clariano. The landscape is made up of calcareous saws of the  cretaceous of orientation SO – SE that delimit this one and other valleys, you refill of marly sediments of the Miocene, which have been uncourses in successive periods of incision along the Plio-Quaternari, as result of the fluvial dynamics and the neo-tectonic activity.

Substratum edaphic of the deposit 
There have been studied from the sedimentological point of view a set of five stratigraphic units of the geological substratum linked to four archaeological structures, corresponding to the numbers 1, 10, 14 (two levels) and 19. Later we will happen to expose different EU.

UE 19000

It corresponds with a top level of the negative structure 19. It is a question of a sediment of sands (40,27 %) with clays of brown greyish dark enough color, and forming few attachés.

UE 14000

It corresponds with a top level of the negative structure 14. It is a question of a sediment formed by clays of greyish color of whitish tones. The percentages of organic matter diminish and increase those of carbonates, though they are similar to the low level (0,45 % and 58,3 % respectively).

UE 14010

It corresponds with the low level of the negative structure 14. It is a question of a sediment formed by clays (more than 50%) with sands and greyish slimes of color of whitish tone (white 5Y 8/1). His characteristics are similar to those of the previous unit, though the sands are less abundant and the processes of decantation are more intense.

UE 10000

It corresponds with the top level of the negative structure 10. It is a question of a sediment formed by clays with sands and slimes little added of brown color and soft grey. Also, small whitish attachés and some gravels of equal origin that in the rest of levels. The percentage of organic matter is high, and that of carbonates, enough down, very similar to those of the stratigraphic low unit.

UE 10010

It corresponds with the low level of the negative structure 10. It is a question of a sediment formed by clays with sands and slimes little added of brown greyish color of clear tone, with small whitish marly attachés. It possesses high percentages of organic matter (0,76 %) and low percentages of carbonate (35,4 %).

UE 1000

There corresponds with the low level of the negative structure number 1. It is a question of a sediment formed by clays with sands and slimes little added of brown greyish color and a very dark grey. There are abundant vegetable carbonized remains, many integrated to the sediment. They are Homogeneous sands rolled of calcareous and quartz (70%), which mix with the marly calcareous substratum that constitutes the landfills in the structure 14. There are high percentages of organic matter (3,42 %) associable to the presence of charcoal generated to low temperature; probably due to the pollution or the contact with the attached landfills or the percentages of carbonate (59,6 %) with the calcareous marls.

Discussion 
We can affirm that the parietal levels of the studied structures show in general a low influence of the human activity, though we have documented an increase of the slimy fraction to the levels of the structure 10 and to the top level of the structure 14, which it might mean that the substratum was affected by the human activities throughout the period of occupation. Inside the perceived uniformity, there are two remarkable associations: on the one hand there are two types of substratum for the levels, and on the other hand, the samples of the structures 14 and 10 come from calcareous tertiary marls. The structures 19 and 1 come on the other hand from sediments few  carbohydrate of gray color and with more organic matter, that we might associate with a substratum Miocene different from the typical calcareous marl or from holocene edaphic formations. On the other hand, the top units seem to possess characteristics that indicate a light worsening in the environmental conditions, though they all in general reflect a few conditions similar to the current ones, result of an evolution from previous moments with more favorable conditions (homestead edaphics levels ).

Description of the Works

The excavation 
After obtained the obligatory permissions on the part of the Headquarter of the Cultural Heritage, and of the Valencian Generality, began the works of excavation to the " Mas of Pepelillo-2 " on March 25, 2008, finishing them on April 29, of the same year. With an excavator machine was started withdrawing the vegetable existing land in the zone that had been marked it was doing a few months, which since have been indicated was where one was thinking that it could stay, the deposit Hispanic-Muslim of the Pepelillo 1. This vision changed, when immediately after one it would be of rains in the surface they appeared a great quantity of fragments of sílex. Also were observed some handmade, prehistoric ceramics. The surprise was big when the first structures started appearing: basins and structures, that where prehistoric materials were also  located. One proceeded to clean the whole zone (3.000 m2) giving place to the appearance of 22 structures.

Later one proceeded to realize a topographic raising and later one started excavating the structures for stratigraphic units using the method Harris and adapting it to this type of structures. Evidently there were realized the habitual works of mapping, plants and sections of all the structures etc.… as well as the double sieve with water to be able to gather material remains of a small size.

The structures 
In the aggregate there were excavated 22 structures of several sizes and morphology. The majority of structure are of more or less circular and / or oval plant; also there were located a few small pits of uncertain functionality. Between the structures of the deposit they stand out:

 Structure 1, being underground with a rounded irregular plant and section in the shape of basin. The base is flat and regular. His dimensions are 0,36 m of maximum depth and a maximum diameter d ' 1,57 m. Two stratigraphic units have differed: the first one, EU 1001, which is formed by numerous blocks, big and average, and some pebble. Stand out 10 fragments of parts of a hand mill. The EU 1002 is formed by a sediment brown very dark color formed by clays by 8 scanty centimeters of average. The sediment is full of remains of possible homes: coals and sediments blackened. The material is almost void, alone a chunk of sílex and an atypical fragment of a hand ceramics.
It is necessary the possibility that it is a question of a pit of warm stones, done to cook food, treating itself about a class of oven that is in use for the celebration of big dinners since in the same ones there is consumed a great quantity of fuelwood, ideal for cooking an entire animal. Also the possible use assumes to them to boil liquids.
 Structure 5: it possesses a circular plant, with section in the shape of basin, with a maximum diameter d ' 1,18 m and with 0,38 m of depth (approximately). The base is regular and flat. There have differed two stratigraphic units, from which the EU 5001 comes up to-28/30 cm of depth and which there is formed by a sediment dark brown clayey color and with sands, little compacted. The fraction is scanty and of average measure. The material is changed, being so, ceramics, sílex, baked clay, coals.
 Structure 12: it has a circular plant with trunk  section. He presents an irregular base. It contains sands and very compacted clays. The fraction is scanty and medium. The material that one found is abundant and varied, obtaining this way ceramics, coals, sílex, ´´malacofauna´´, and baked clay between others.
 Structure 12: it has a circular plant with trunk  section. He presents an irregular base. It contains sands and very compacted clays. The fraction is scanty and medium. The material that one found is abundant and varied, obtaining this way ceramics, coals, sílex, ´´malacofauna´´, and baked clay between others.
 Structure 19: it is a structure with circular plant, regular and flat base. The material is changed, emphasize the baked clay with form, wildlife, coals, sílex, ´´malacofauna´´ and  sea-coast ceramics.

The materials

The ceramics 
The ceramic opposing industry, it is formed by 1.080 fragments, 929 are atypical, the rest, that is to say, 151, it is formed by lips, elements of prensión, bases and decorated fragments. The majority of the pastas are slightly elegant, with desengrasantes of medium dimensions. Entering already the most detailed analysis of the ceramic industry, in the Pepelillo one has found a total of 107 lips, being more numerous the rounded ones (85,9 %). The elements of pressure are extraordinarily scanty with a total of 9 ´´mamelones ´´of different dimensions and a handle tape. For what it concerns to the forms, the fragmentation has done that only 11 forms could be identified. It is necessary to mention that they dominate the forms of class To and B with 4 workforce each one.
What makes the ceramic industry of the Pepelillo more interesting is the small set of decorated ceramics: The first fragment, proceeding from superficial withdrawal, from the body of a glass, decorated with stuffed bands of small impressions done with a species of small comb, combined with free bands of decoration, with a surface that preserves remains of straightening and that combines boiling oxidizer and reductive.
Degreasing it is small almost invaluably. It is a question of a bell-shaped maritime printed fragment of the variety "Herringbone". Of the structure 2, EU 2001, there are two small decorated fragments: the first one, 2001.63, which it is a small ceramic fragment of the body, with boiling exterior oxidizer and reductive, small degreaser  and decoration based on bands printed with an instrument or (small comb) with free bands. The surface is very eroded.

Another fragment, 2001.62, is a small fragment with boiling oxidizer both in his interior and in the exterior, possessing a very small degreaser  and a decoration done also with printed bands and in turn made with a "gradina"( small comb).

Though the surface is eroded, signs stay of beautified. The last clearly bell-shaped fragment located also in the structure 2, EU 2001 (2001.60). It is a question of a fragment of a small hemispherical bowl, with rounded lip, with boiling reductive and polishing surface, not eroded. The glass is decorated by bands made with the technology of incision and you refill with scrappy lines, leaving the free bands without decorating. The latter fragment is typical of post-maritime moments, a scrappy variety inside the bell-shaped Valencian´s one.

Silex-flint 
The industry lítica of the Pepelillo (241 in total) is typical of the III-IV millennium to. C, and in general of the neolithic one. The important component stands out to laminate of the industry observed in the materials of superficial withdrawal, and the presence of the retouch plane - invader in for example, sheets, top of arrow and someone splinters.

Stone 
The instruments of grinding are abundant, the majority fragments, overcoat passive parts that add a total of 11 and of these, 5 are active (only 3 remain you inform). The case of the structure is necessary to emphasize 1, in which there appeared 9 fragments of mill, 6 passive and active parts 3, in a practically sterile landfill, with a structure of very irregular plant and section in the shape of basin with flat and regular base and with a maximum diameter of 1,57 m and so alone 0,36 m of depth. The sediment stands out for the great quantity of organic matter, I settle deeply blackened with abundant carbones; being able to treat about a structure of combustion. Of the instruments of grinding about which already one has spoken, stand out two bracelets of calcareous stone, one with a more or less square section and other one oval.

Baked clay 
It is a question approximately 177 fragments as the most abundant material rest after the ceramics and the remains, lytic in total. The baked clay is very abundant in two structures. In 10, so much in the EU 10001 as in 10002, some of the fragments present forms, flat, rounded and different faces with brands of foliage.

Wildlife 
In the deposit of the alone Pepelillo there have been identified two structures that have provided  by faunal remains:
 The structure 19, EU 19.001: In this structure the only rest has recovered wildlife in very poor condition of conservation and I rotate in numerous fragments. It is a question of a metapodium diaphysis of bovine (Bos Taurus).
 The structure 10, EU 10.001: The remains faunísticos located in this structure are a bit more numerous. Here also a rest has been identified of bovinely (Bos taurus). It is a question of a radio diaphysis, that also it is very much affected by processes post-depositional, so that there have been identified neither brands of butcher's shop nor alterations of animal origin.

Malacology 
Between the malacology recovered to Pepelillo the best represented kind is Glycymeris sp., with a total of twenty-three remains belonging to a minimal number of seven valves. Most of the remains is fragments of small measure with fractures not eroded, that is to say, that broke in the deposit. Only two valves remain compline with a height about 50 mm, one of them with the "natis" perforated by natural erosion, and other one not eroded but he lacking it good part of the edge for, current fracture. Another rest of mollusks of marine origin is a fragment of very small dimension belonging to the hinge of an indeterminate bivalve.

The presence of Glycymeris's valves turns out to be very frequent in a context of life outdoors of the final Neolithic / Chalcolitic of the central region of the peninsular Mediterranean, where they appear in a high number of remains, between 51 and 87%. Good part of the valves they are affected by the marine erode in major or minor measure, indicative fact of which his withdrawal goes away to carry out in the beach, once died the animal.

These factors, they point at the fact from which good part of the valves of this kind they were gathered for his utilization as tools, as small containers of matter colouring or as smoothers. The fact that some valve receives documents with the perforated "natis" it does not indicate necessarily that should use as elements of decoration since it has been considered traditionally, since those who present the a nthropic drilling, and are in the habit of having a more limited size.

Coals: The carbonaceous vegetation in Pepelillo's Mas 
In Pepelillo's deposit  there has recovered coal proceeding from 14 structures, which have offered some quantities of this type of material, being scanty in some, but representatively enough in others. In the Mas de Pepelillo, the fact that the wood is carbonized, it refers to the use of the fire, servant or native.

The results of the analysis of the coal have offered a floral scanty list. The content of every structure is different from qualitative and quantitative level, but some dominant species are detected, more than for his relative global values, for his ubiquity in many structures, since it is the example of the Quercus.

The lack of indicators of antropización evident in some of the mentioned deposits, as well as in Pepelillo's  deposit, can have several readings, besides which it is a question of a relatively short occupation. A more long occupation yes that would stop to feel the effects of this exploitation, with the setback of the woodlands and the progression of warning species of the presence it humanizes.

Conclusions 
The Pepelillo has gone to thinking about the meaning of the bell-shaped horizon. The metal and the work of this (metallurgy), the settlements in height and possibly the social differences, are given in moments lightly previous to the appearance of the bell-shaped phenomenon. Towards to the half of the millennium III B.C. lands come to our the bell-shaped ceramics close to other elements that shape the bell-shaped horizon.
From the arrival of the bell-shaped maritime one, (temporary short horizon and territorial scanty presence) will develop a few ceramic local varieties (scrappy,´´ pseudo-excisas´´ stamped ...) that will spread all over the country. In this period of approximately 500 years, two models of habitat will coexist: the traditional one in plain and the deposits in height that seems that they will not last, up to come to the age of the bronze. Near  to the Pepelillo there is situated a good example of the coexistence of these models, the head-board of the Vinalopó-marsh, which he us sends to the existence of an important set of deposits that present material remains own of the bell-shaped world in a territory of approximately 1.600 hectares. Example of them is a deposit in plain, the ´´Molino Rojo´´, which occupies a great extension, which would initiate his occupation at the end of the millennium IV and which would develop during the whole following millennium, ending his life at the end of this one, last moment of the, Chalcolithic with presence of bell-shaped ceramics "pseudo-excisa".

References

Bibliography 
 Pascual Beneyto J., Ribera. A, Barberà. M., Ferrer. C., Carrión. Y., López. L., Hortelano. I., Pérez Jordá G. (2016). ´´Un nucli de Sitges calcolítiques al Mas de Pepelillo (Agullent)´´. Serie de Trabajos Varios 119 . Del neolític a l´edat del bronze en el Mediterrani Occidental: estudis en homenatge a Bernat Martí Oliver. TV SIP 119. pp. 287–310.

External links 
 Museu de Prehistòria de València

Archaeological sites in the Valencian Community